The American Fraternal Alliance (AFA) is an umbrella group of fraternal orders in the United States. It was founded as the National Fraternal Congress of America in 1913, in Chicago and adopted its current name in 2011.

History 
The origins of the AFA go back to November 17, 1886, when a congress of sixteen fraternal orders representing 535,000 members met in Washington, DC. The original meeting was called by the Ancient Order of United Workmen, the pioneer fraternal insurance society, to establish uniform insurance legislation in all states. The meeting formed a permanent organization, the National Fraternal Congress (NFC).

On March 21, 1901, several fraternal orders created the rival Associated Fraternities of America in Chicago. It was created "as a protest against the workings" of the NFC. The two groups re-merged in 1913 as the  National Fraternal Congress of America.

Another group the competed with the NFC for a time was the American Fraternal Congress, which was organized in Omaha, Nebraska, in 1898. This group differed from the NFC in that it only allowed orders that had adopted the legal reserve system to be members. 

The NFC adopted a Uniform Bill for state insurance regulations in 1893. In 1910, with the assistance of the National Association of Insurance Commissioners – it promulgated  the Mobile bill, which was modified in 1912 as the New York Conference bill. It also created a mortality table in 1899.

Publications 

The NFC published a magazine, Fraternal Monitor and an annual Statistics, Fraternal Societies.

Membership 
The current members of the AFA include:

Alliance of Transylvanian Saxons
American Mutual Life Association
Association of the Sons of Poland
Baptist Life Association
Catholic Association of Foresters
Catholic Family Fraternal of the State of Texas (KJZT)
Catholic Financial Life
Catholic Holy Family Society
Catholic Ladies of Columbia
Catholic Life Insurance
Catholic Order of Foresters
Catholic Union of Texas, The KJT
Catholic United Financial
Croatian Fraternal Union of America
CSA Fraternal Life
Degree of Honor Protective Association
Employes Mutual Benefit Association
Everence Association, Inc.
First Catholic Slovak Ladies Association of the USA
First Catholic Slovak Union of the USA and Canada
GBU Financial Life
Gleaner Life Insurance Society
Grand Court Order of Calanthe
Greek Catholic Union of the USA (GCU)
Independent Order of Foresters
Knights of Columbus
Knights of Peter Claver, Inc.
KSKJ Life, American Slovenian Catholic Union
Ladies Pennsylvania Slovak Catholic Union
Loyal Christian Benefit Association (LCBA)
Luso-American Life Insurance Society
Modern Woodmen of America
National Catholic Society of Foresters
National Mutual Benefit
National Slovak Society
Order of the Sons of Hermann in the State of Texas
Order of United Commercial Travelers of America
Police and Firemen’s Insurance Association
Polish Falcons of America
Polish National Alliance of the United States of North America
Polish National Union of America
Polish Roman Catholic Union of America
Polish Union of the United States of North America
Portuguese Fraternal Society of America
Providence Association of Ukrainian Catholics in America
Royal Neighbors of America
Russian Brotherhood Organization of the USA
Serb National Federation
Slovak Catholic Sokol
Slovak Gymnastic Union Sokol of the USA
Slovene National Benefit Society
Sons of Norway
SPJST
Supreme Council of the Royal Arcanum
Thrivent
Ukrainian National Association, Inc.
United Transportation Union Insurance Association
Western Catholic Union
Western Fraternal Life Association
Woman’s Life Insurance Society
Woodmen of the World and/or Assured Life Association
Woodmen of the World/Omaha Woodmen Life Insurance Society
WSA Fraternal Life

And in Canada:

ACTRA Fraternal Benefit Society
FaithLife Financial
Grand Orange Lodge of British America Benefit Fund
Independent Order of Foresters
Knights of Columbus
Order of United Commercial Travelers of America
Sons of Scotland Benevolent Association
Supreme Council of the Royal Arcanum
Teachers Life Insurance Society
Toronto Police Widows and Orphans Fund
Ukrainian Fraternal Society of Canada

See also 
Canadian Fraternal Association

References

External links 
Official Homepage

Organizations established in 1913
Supraorganizations
1913 establishments in Illinois
Fraternal orders